The Red Deer Rustlers were a Junior A ice hockey team in the Alberta Junior Hockey League based in Red Deer, Alberta. They captured the inaugural Centennial Trophy in 1971. Their eight AJHL championships remains the second most in league history, behind the Calgary Canucks nine championships.

Division titles won: 1982–83, 83–84, 84–85, 88–89
Regular season titles won: 1970–71, 73–74, 79–80, 84–85, 88–89
League Championships won: 1970, 71, 72, 74, 80, 85, 87, 89
Doyle Cup Titles: none (captured 3 AB/BC titles before the creation of the Doyle Cup)
Centennial Trophy Titles: 1971, 80

History
The Rustlers joined the AJHL in 1967 on the orders of the Alberta Amateur Hockey Association, which blocked their attempt at joining the Western Canada Hockey League as an expansion team.  The Rustlers would quickly rise to the top of the AJHL, capturing four league titles in five years between 1970 and 1974. In 1971, they captured the first Centennial Trophy as Canadian Junior A national champions. The Rustlers repeated that feat in 1980.

During this time, the Rustlers developed many players who would go on to play major-junior or college hockey, while 20 ultimately played in the National Hockey League. Among them were all six members of the Sutter family to play in the NHL: Brian, Darryl, Duane, Brent, Ron and Rich.  Gary Sutter, the seventh, and only, brother not to play in the NHL turned down an invitation to play for the Rustlers in 1972.

In 1989, after winning their eighth league championship, the Rustlers were expelled from the league for violating its by-laws.  The team remained suspended until 1992 when it officially folded, making room for the Red Deer Rebels, as the central Alberta city finally joined the WHL.

Season-by-season record 
Note: GP = Games played, W = Wins, L = Losses, T = Ties Pts = Points, GF = Goals for, GA = Goals against

†Team granted a one-year leave of absence in 1985-86.  They would re-emerge in 1986-87 under new ownership.

Playoffs
1971 Won League, Won Alta/BC Championship, Won Abbott Cup, Won 1971 Centennial Cup
Red Deer Rustlers defeated Mount Royal College 4-games-to-1
Red Deer Rustlers defeated Lethbridge Sugar Kings 4-games-to-1 AJHL CHAMPIONS
Red Deer Rustlers defeated Penticton Broncos (BCJHL) 4-games-to-3 ALTA/BC CHAMPIONS
Red Deer Rustlers defeated St. Boniface Saints (MJHL) 4-games-to-none ABBOTT CUP CHAMPIONS
Red Deer Rustlers defeated Charlottetown Islanders (MJAHL) 4-games-to-2 CENTENNIAL CUP CHAMPIONS
1972 Won League, Won Alta/BC Championship, Won Abbott Cup, Lost 1972 Centennial Cup
Red Deer Rustlers defeated Lethbridge Sugar Kings 4-games-to-3
Red Deer Rustlers defeated Calgary Canucks 4-games-to-1 AJHL CHAMPIONS
Red Deer Rustlers defeated Vernon Essos (BCJHL) 4-games-to-2 ALTA/BC CHAMPIONS
Red Deer Rustlers defeated Humboldt Broncos (SJHL) 4-games-to-1 ABBOTT CUP CHAMPIONS
Guelph CMC's (SOJHL) defeated Red Deer Rustlers 4-games-to-none
1973 Lost Final
Red Deer Rustlers defeated The Pass Red Devils 4-games-to-2
Calgary Canucks defeated Red Deer Rustlers 4-games-to-3
1974 Won League, Lost Alta/BC Championship
Red Deer Rustlers defeated Edmonton Mets 4-games-to-none
Red Deer Rustlers defeated The Pass Red Devils 4-games-to-1 AJHL CHAMPIONS
Kelowna Buckaroos (BCJHL) defeated Red Deer Rustlers 4-games-to-1
1975 DNQ
1976 Lost Semi-final
Spruce Grove Mets defeated Red Deer Rustlers 4-games-to-2
1977 Lost Semi-final round robin
Red Deer Rustlers defeated Fort Saskatchewan Traders 4-games-to-2
Third in semi-final round robin (1-3) vs. Calgary Canucks and Taber Golden Suns
1978 Lost Quarter-final
St. Albert Saints defeated Red Deer Rustlers 4-games-to-3
1979 Lost Quarter-final
Calgary Canucks defeated Red Deer Rustlers 4-games-to-none
1980 Won League, Won Alta/BC Championship, Won Abbott Cup, Won 1980 Centennial Cup
Red Deer Rustlers defeated Sherwood Park Crusaders 3-games-to-none
Red Deer Rustlers defeated St. Albert Saints 4-games-to-1
Red Deer Rustlers defeated Calgary Canucks 4-games-to-1 AJHL CHAMPIONS
Red Deer Rustlers defeated Penticton Knights (BCJHL) 4-games-to-none ALTA/BC CHAMPIONS
Red Deer Rustlers defeated Prince Albert Raiders (SJHL) 4-games-to-2 ABBOTT CUP CHAMPIONS
First in 1980 Centennial Cup round robin (3-1)
Red Deer Rustlers defeated North York Rangers (OPJHL) 3-2 in final CENTENNIAL CUP CHAMPIONS
1981 Lost Quarter-final
St. Albert Saints defeated Red Deer Rustlers 3-games-to-1
1982 Lost Semi-final
Red Deer Rustlers defeated Calgary Canucks 4-games-to-none
Calgary Spurs defeated Red Deer Rustlers 4-games-to-1
1983 Lost Semi-final
Red Deer Rustlers defeated Olds Grizzlys 4-games-to-1
Calgary Canucks defeated Red Deer Rustlers 4-games-to-2
1984 Lost Final
Red Deer Rustlers defeated Hobbema Hawks 4-games-to-1
Red Deer Rustlers defeated Calgary Spurs 4-games-to-1
Fort Saskatchewan Traders defeated Red Deer Rustlers 4-games-to-none
1985 Won League, Lost Doyle Cup
Red Deer Rustlers defeated Olds Grizzlys 4-games-to-none
Red Deer Rustlers defeated Calgary Spurs 4-games-to-none
Red Deer Rustlers defeated Sherwood Park Crusaders 4-games-to-2 AJHL CHAMPIONS
Penticton Knights (BCJHL) defeated Red Deer Rustlers 4-games-to-1
1986 Did Not Participate
1987 Won League, Lost Doyle Cup
Red Deer Rustlers defeated Calgary Spurs 4-games-to-3
Red Deer Rustlers defeated Calgary Canucks 4-games-to-3
Red Deer Rustlers defeated St. Albert Saints 4-games-to-2 AJHL CHAMPIONS
Richmond Sockeyes (BCJHL) defeated Red Deer Rustlers 4-games-to-3
1988 Lost Semi-final
Red Deer Rustlers defeated Olds Grizzlys 4-games-to-2
Calgary Canucks defeated Red Deer Rustlers 4-games-to-none
1989 Won League, Lost Doyle Cup
Red Deer Rustlers defeated Calgary Spurs 4-games-to-1
Red Deer Rustlers defeated Olds Grizzlys 4-games-to-1
Red Deer Rustlers defeated Fort Saskatchewan Traders 4-games-to-1 AJHL CHAMPIONS
Vernon Lakers (BCJHL) defeated Red Deer Rustlers 4-games-to-2

NHL alumni 

Darrel Anholt
Clayton Beddoes
Rod Buskas
Phil Crowe
Glenn Johannesen
Kelly Kisio
Darryl Maggs
Randy Moller
Brian Ogilvie
Ray Podloski
Ron Shudra
Brent Sutter
Brian Sutter
Darryl Sutter
Duane Sutter
Rich Sutter
Ron Sutter
Dixon Ward
Blake Wesley
Glen Wesley

See also
 List of ice hockey teams in Alberta

References
General
Alberta Junior Hockey League website
AJHL Annual Guide & Record Book 2006–07

Footnotes

Defunct Alberta Junior Hockey League teams
Defunct ice hockey teams in Alberta
Defunct junior ice hockey teams in Canada
Sport in Red Deer, Alberta
Ice hockey clubs established in 1967
Sports clubs disestablished in 1992
1967 establishments in Alberta
1989 disestablishments in Alberta